Jerren Kendall Nixon (born 25 June 1973) is a Trinidadian former professional footballer who played as a forward. After beginning his career with Trinidadian clubs Airport Authority and ECM Motown, Nixon signed for Dundee United in 1993, where he won the Scottish Cup in his first season. In 1995, he joined FC Zürich and went on to spend eight years playing in Switzerland, where he also had spells with Yverdon-Sport and FC St. Gallen. He ended his career back in Trinidad with North East Stars, where he was also interim head coach for a time. Nixon made 38 international appearances for Trinidad and Tobago between 1993 and 2004, twice playing at the CONCACAF Gold Cup.

Career
Born in the village of Morvant, just outside Port of Spain, Nixon began his career in Trinidad playing for ECM Motown before moving to Scotland in 1993, joining Dundee United. Impressive early form for the Tannadice Park side prompted then manager Ivan Golac to declare he would one day be worth £20 million. Nixon later said that Golac's inflated valuation of him hampered his career. He helped the club to win the 1993–94 Scottish Cup, but left a year later for £200,000 after they were relegated from the Premier Division. He spent the next eight years of his career in Swiss football, with FC Zürich, Yverdon-Sport FC and FC St. Gallen.

In 2003 Nixon returned to Trinidad after a trial with Dallas Burn failed to lead to a contract. He joined North East Stars, winning the league title in 2004, and finishing as top scorer. In September 2005, he was appointed as interim coach of the club.

Nixon has represented his country at every level from Under-17 to full international. He made his full debut for the Trinidad and Tobago national team in 1993, and made his last appearance in 2004.

Honours
Dundee United
 Scottish Cup: 1993–94

North East Stars
 TT Pro League: 2004

Individual
 TT Pro League top scorer: 2004

References

External links
Profile from socawarriors.net
Profile from Soca Warriors Online

1973 births
Living people
Trinidad and Tobago footballers
Association football wingers
Trinidad and Tobago international footballers
TT Pro League players
Scottish Football League players
Swiss Super League players
Dundee United F.C. players
FC St. Gallen players
FC Zürich players
North East Stars F.C. players
1998 CONCACAF Gold Cup players
2000 CONCACAF Gold Cup players
Trinidad and Tobago football managers
TT Pro League managers
Trinidad and Tobago expatriate footballers
Trinidad and Tobago expatriate sportspeople in Scotland
Expatriate footballers in Scotland
Trinidad and Tobago expatriate sportspeople in Switzerland
Expatriate footballers in Switzerland